Felipe da Maia (born 25 January 1993) is a retired Brazililian footballer who played as a forward.

Career statistics

Club

Notes

References

1993 births
Living people
Brazilian footballers
Association football forwards
Vila Nova Futebol Clube players
Anápolis Futebol Clube players
Araguaína Futebol e Regatas players
Campeonato Brasileiro Série B players